Vaux-sur-Somme (literally Vaux on Somme) is a commune in the Somme department in Hauts-de-France in northern France.

History 

Vaux-sur-Somme is notable as the place where famous flying ace Manfred von Richthofen, better known as the Red Baron during World War I, was shot down and killed on April 21, 1918.

Demographics

See also
Communes of the Somme department

References

Communes of Somme (department)